Ko Poda is an island off the west coast of Thailand, in Krabi Province, about  from Ao Nang. It is part of the Mu Ko Poda, or Poda Group Islands, which are under the administration of Hat Nopharat Thara-Mu Ko Phi Phi National Park. The group consists of Ko Poda, Ko Kai, Ko Mo and Ko Thap.

References

Islands of Thailand
Geography of Krabi province
Poda